The  Los Angeles Rams season was the team's 23rd year with the National Football League and the 15th season in Los Angeles.  Under first-year head coach Bob Waterfield, the team won four and lost seven with one tie, placing the Rams in sixth place in the Western Conference, ahead of only the winless expansion Dallas Cowboys. Their most notable win was an upset of the Green Bay Packers at Milwaukee on  Four weeks later in the season finale, the Packers returned the favor in Los Angeles to win the Western  It was also the first season in which the Rams would share the same venue as the upstart Los Angeles Chargers of the American Football League (AFL) before the team would leave for San Diego in 1961. The Rams would not share the same venue with the Chargers until 2020 when both teams would move into SoFi Stadium in the suburb of Inglewood.

In the pre-season, the Rams played the Cowboys in rural northeastern Oregon, at Pendleton's rodeo grounds on Sunday,

Schedule

Standings

References

Los Angeles Rams
Los Angeles Rams seasons
Los Angeles Rams